is a Japanese curler.

At the national level, he is a four-time Japan mixed doubles champion curler (2007, 2011, 2012, 2015).

Teams and events

Men's

Mixed doubles

Personal life 
His wife, Michiko Tomabechi is also a competitive curler. Together, they are four time national mixed doubles champions, and they have played four times in the World Mixed Doubles Curling Championship for Japan.

References

External links

1978 births
Living people
Japanese male curlers
Japanese curling champions
Place of birth missing (living people)